Owdlu or Uddolu or Udlu may refer to:
 Owdlu, Ardabil